The following is a list of RAL Classic colours from the RAL colour standard. The visual samples are approximate and informative only.

RAL Classic

Yellow and beige

Orange

Red

Violet

Blue

Green

Grey

Brown

White and black

Overview 
Below is a list of RAL Classic colours from the RAL colour standard. Alongside every colour, the corresponding values are given for:

 hexadecimal triplet for the sRGB colour space, approximating the given RAL colour
 sRGB value
 Grey value calculated from (0.2126 × red) + (0.7152 × green) + (0.0722 × blue)
 CIE L*a*b* values
 sRGB value expressed as hue, saturation and lightness (HSL)
 device-independent CMYK value: cyan, magenta, yellow, black or key
 LRV, but a consistent light reflectance value is not obtainable from pearlescent or metallic colours

The visual samples displayed on the screen are not binding because brightness and contrast may vary from screen to screen – and neither are the colours on a printout from a printer. For binding colour samples, always obtain an official RAL Colour fan deck.

RAL Effect

RAL Design System+ 

In the RAL Design System Plus, there are groups of colours every 10° of hue and additionally at 75°, 85° and 95°. Possible lightness values are 15% through 90% in steps of 5% for monochromatic shades of gray (i.e. C = 0%) and 20% through 90% in steps of 10% and additionally 85% and 93%. Chroma values are also mostly confined to steps of 10% or 5%, but with some exceptions, and the maximum value varies.

References

RAL color standard
Ral